Burhan Bozkurt (born 1934) is a Turkish wrestler. He competed in the men's Greco-Roman flyweight at the 1964 Summer Olympics.

References

External links
 

1934 births
Living people
Turkish male sport wrestlers
Olympic wrestlers of Turkey
Wrestlers at the 1964 Summer Olympics
Place of birth missing (living people)
World Wrestling Championships medalists